Men's coxless four competition at the 2008 Summer Olympics in Beijing was held between August 9 and 16, at the Shunyi Olympic Rowing-Canoeing Park.

This rowing event is a sweep rowing event, meaning that each rower has one oar and rows on only one side. Four rowers crew each boat, and no coxswain is used. The competition consists of multiple rounds. Finals were held to determine the placing of each boat; these finals were given letters with those nearer to the beginning of the alphabet meaning a better ranking. Semifinals were named based on which finals they fed, with each semifinal having two possible finals.

During the first round three heats were held. The top three boats in each heat advanced to the A/B semifinals, with the remaining boats going to the repechage. A single repechage heat was held, with the top three boats from that heat also advancing to the A/B semifinal. The lone remaining boat, placing fourth in the repechage, received a final rank of 13th of the 13 boats competing.

Only A/B semifinals were held. For each of the two semifinal races, the top three boats moved on to the better of the two finals (the A final), while the bottom three boats went to the lesser of the two finals (the B final).

The third and final round was the Finals. Each final determined a set of rankings. The A final determined the medals, along with the rest of the places through 6th. The B final gave rankings from 7th to 12th.

Schedule
All times are China Standard Time (UTC+8)

Results

Heats
Qualification Rules: 1-3->SA/B, 4..->R

Heat 1

Heat 2

Heat 3

Repechage
Qualification Rules: 1-3->SA/B

Semifinals A/B
Qualification Rules: 1-3->FA, 4..->FB

Semifinal A/B 1

Semifinal A/B 2

Final B

Final A

Australia took out an early lead and had were leading by about one boat length at the 500 m to go mark. At that point the favored British crew began to take back ground and took the lead with about 200 m to go, eventually winning by half a length. France came back from last at one point to grab the bronze.

References

External links
NYT Olympic Report

Rowing at the 2008 Summer Olympics
Men's events at the 2008 Summer Olympics